The Colorado Mammoth are a lacrosse team based in Denver, Colorado playing in the National Lacrosse League (NLL). The 2006 season was the 20th in franchise history and 4th as the Mammoth.

The Mammoth finished 2nd in the West with a 10-6 record, but beat both Calgary and Arizona in one-goal games to make it to the Championship game against the Buffalo Bandits. The Bandits, however, were no match for the Mammoth, who took the game 16-9, making lacrosse legend Gary Gait an NLL champion in his first season as head coach.

Regular season

Conference standings

Game log
Reference:

Playoffs

Game log
Reference:

Player stats
Reference:

Runners (Top 10)

Note: GP = Games played; G = Goals; A = Assists; Pts = Points; LB = Loose Balls; PIM = Penalty minutes

Goaltenders
Note: GP = Games played; MIN = Minutes; W = Wins; L = Losses; GA = Goals against; Sv% = Save percentage; GAA = Goals against average

Awards

Transactions

Trades

Roster
Reference:

See also
2006 NLL season

References

Colorado
National Lacrosse League Champion's Cup-winning seasons
2006 in sports in Colorado